The Step-Up Books were published by Random House in the 1960s and 1970s as a follow-on series for students who had surpassed the reading level of the I Can Read books.

Titles

Nature Library
 Animals Do the Strangest Things, by Leonora and Arthur Hornblow, illustrated by Michael K. Frith
 Birds Do the Strangest Things
 Fish Do Strangest Things
 Insects Do the Strangest Things
 Reptiles Do the Strangest Things
 Prehistoric Monsters Do the Strangest Things
 Plants Do Amazing Things, by Hedda Nussbaum, illustrated by Joe Mathieu
 Animals Build Amazing Homes
 Sea Creatures Do the Strangest Things

Story of America
 Meet the North American Indians
 Meet Christopher Columbus
 Meet the Pilgrim Fathers, by Elizabeth Payne; illustrated by H.B. Vestal (1966)
 Meet Benjamin Franklin
 Meet George Washington, by Joan Heilbroner, illustrated by Victor Mays (1964)
 The Adventures of Lewis and Clark
 Meet Thomas Jefferson, by Marvin Barrett (1967)
 Meet Andrew Jackson, by Ormonde de Kay, Jr., illustrated by Isa Barnett (1967)
 Meet Robert E. Lee
 Meet Abraham Lincoln
 Meet Theodore Roosevelt
 Meet John F. Kennedy
 Meet Martin Luther King, Jr.
 White House Children
 Meet the Men Who Sailed the Seas by John Dyment
 The Story of Flight by Mary Lee Settle

History
 Secrets of the Mummies by Joyce Milton
 True-Life Treasure Hunts

Sports Library
 Baseball Players Do Amazing Things
 Football Players Do Amazing Things 
 Basketball Players Do Amazing Things
 Wonder Women of Sports

Fun and Adventure
 Put Your Foot in Your Mouth and Other Silly Sayings
 Star Wars: The Making of the Movie
 Daredevils Do Amazing Things
 Magicians Do Amazing Things
 Kids Do Amazing Things

Series of children's books
Children's non-fiction books
Random House books
Series of non-fiction books